The Church of San Miguel (Spanish: Iglesia de San Miguel) is a church located in Vitoria, Spain. It was declared Bien de Interés Cultural in 1995.

The retable of the church is a baroque altarpiece; it is one of the finest works by Gregorio Fernández and his workshop.

References

External links 

Churches in Álava
Bien de Interés Cultural landmarks in Álava